Peter Raymond "Hap" Morse (December 6, 1886 – June 19, 1974) was a shortstop in Major League Baseball. Nicknamed "Pete", he played for the St. Louis Cardinals in 1911.

References

External links

1886 births
1974 deaths
Baseball players from Saint Paul, Minnesota
Edmonton Eskimos (baseball) players
Helena Senators players
Major League Baseball shortstops
Missoula (minor league baseball) players
Philadelphia Phillies scouts
St. Louis Cardinals players
Spokane Indians players
Tacoma Tigers players